The Colgate Raiders men's basketball team represents Colgate University in Hamilton, New York in NCAA Division I competition. The school's team competes in the Patriot League and play their home games in Cotterell Court.

Postseason history

NCAA tournament results
The Raiders have appeared in six NCAA Tournaments. Their combined record is 0–6.

CBI results
The Raiders have appeared in the College Basketball Invitational (CBI) one time. Their record is 0–1.

Retired numbers
Colgate has retired five numbers to date:

Players in international leagues

Will Rayman (born 1997), American-Israeli basketball player for Hapoel Haifa in the Israeli Basketball Premier League

References

External links